Namhkam is the name of several towns in Myanmar (Burma):

 Namhkam, Shan State
 Namhkam, Hkamti, Sagaing Region
 Namkham, Homalin, Sagaing Region